The jutti or Punjabi Jutti is a type of footwear common in North India, Pakistan, and neighboring regions. They are traditionally made up of leather and with extensive embroidery, in real gold and silver thread as inspired by royalty in the subcontinent over 400 years ago. Prior to that, Rajputs of the northwest used to wear leather juttis, also called ethnic shoes. Now with changing times, different juttis with rubber soles are made available. Besides the Punjabi jutti, there are various local styles as well. Today Amritsar and Patiala ("tilla jutti") are important trade centers for handcrafted juttis, from where they are exported all over the world to Punjabi diaspora. Closely related to mojaris. Juttis have evolved into several localized design variations, even depending upon the shoemaker. However by large, they have no left or right distinction, and over time take the shape of the foot. They usually have flat sole, and are similar in design for both women and men, except for men they have a sharp extended tip,  curved upwards like traditional moustaches, and are also called khussa, and some women’s juttis are backless. Even with changing times juttis have remained part of ceremonial attire, especially at weddings, the unembellished juttis are used for everyday use for both men and women in most of Punjab, mostly called Jalsa Jutti which is blackish in color.

Overview

There is a wide variety of juttis (pronounced 'jeut-tii' in Punjabi or 'jeu-tea' in Hindi/Urdu) available for both men and women. During certain festivals special juttis are also fitted to the feet of cows. Elsewhere in India, juttis are commonly also known as mojari, while an alternative name in Pakistan is khussa. They are now very popular in the West too. Like mojaris, these are long shoes with the end curled upwards. They have been traditionally handed down over generations, with each generation contributing some variation to it. These are the traditional ethnic Indian footwear.

They are usually made of fine leather and are delicately embroidered with threads or beads. Juttis are slip-on in style and are characterized by rising high to the Achilles tendon in the back and covering the toes with a round or M-shaped heavily-embroidered upper, leaving the top of the foot nearly bare. Some feature extensive hand-done embroidery. 

It is believed that one of the earliest examples of footwear worn on the Indian subcontinent is a sandal of wood, datable to circa 200 BC. During the 3rd and 4th centuries in the Buddhist period, it was quite common to wear strapped sandals and Indian kings wore sandals ornamented with precious jewels. Jain literature shows that leather was used for the making of shoes, which protected the toes from getting injured. Hides of cows, buffaloes, goats, sheep and other wild animals were used.

See also 
 Mojari - similar shoe from same region
 Turban training centre -turban academies opened everywhere in Punjab which teaches the art of modern turban tying with various styles like Morni Dastar, Patiala Shahi
 Kung fu shoe

References

External links

 

Shoes
Indian footwear
Pakistani footwear
Punjabi culture
Punjabi clothing
Mughal art
Indian leather industry